Shirabad or Shir-Abad may refer to:

Shirabad Waterfall, Iran
Shirabad, Afghanistan
Shirabad, Uzbekistan
Parakar, Armenia, formerly Shirabad
Shirabad, Gilan, a village in Talesh County, Gilan Province, Iran
Shirabad Mahalleh, a village in Talesh County, Gilan Province, Iran
Shirabad, East Azerbaijan, a village in Heris County, East Azerbaijan Province, Iran
Shirabad, Golestan, a village in Ramian County, Golestan Province, Iran
Shirabad, Hamadan, a village in Hamadan County, Hamadan Province, Iran
Shirabad, Nahavand, a village in Nahavand County, Hamadan Province, Iran
Shirabad, Kerman, a village in Rigan County, Kerman Province, Iran
Shirabad, Kermanshah, a village in Sonqor County, Kermanshah Province, Iran
Shirabad, Maneh and Samalqan, a village in North Khorasan Province, Iran
Shirabad, Shirvan, a village in North Khorasan Province, Iran
Shirabad, Razavi Khorasan, a village in Razavi Khorasan Province, Iran
Shirabad, Irandegan, a village in Khash County, Sistan and Baluchestan Province, Iran
Shirabad, South Khorasan, a village in South Khorasan Province, Iran
Shirabad, West Azerbaijan, a village in West Azerbaijan Province, Iran

See also 
Sherabad (disambiguation)
Shir (disambiguation)